Autosticha euryterma is a moth in the family Autostichidae. It was described by Edward Meyrick in 1920. It is found in Kenya.

References

Endemic moths of Kenya
Moths described in 1920
Autosticha
Moths of Africa